Blanca Lacambra Sáiz (born 28 August 1965, in San Sebastián) is a retired Spanish sprinter who competed primarily in the 200 and 400 metres. She represented her country at the 1988 Summer Olympics, as well as three consecutive World Championships, starting in 1987. In addition, she won the silver medal at the 1987 European Indoor Championships and multiple medals at the Ibero-American Championships

Competition record

Personal bests
Outdoor
 100 metres – 11.61 (+1.3 m/s) (Barcelona 1987)
 200 metres – 23.04 (0.0 m/s) (Mexico City 1988)
 400 metres – 51.73 (Madrid 1988)
Indoor
 200 metres – 23.19 (Liévin 1987)
 400 metres – 54.34 (Piraeus 1985)

References

 All-Athletics profile

1965 births
Living people
Sportspeople from San Sebastián
Spanish female sprinters
Olympic athletes of Spain
Athletes (track and field) at the 1988 Summer Olympics
World Athletics Championships athletes for Spain
Athletes from the Basque Country (autonomous community)
Olympic female sprinters